Pass Cavallo, alternately known as Cavallo Pass,  is one of five natural water inlets which separate the Gulf of Mexico and Matagorda Bay, in the U.S. state of Texas. Matagorda Island Lighthouse was originally built on this site. During the Civil War, Pass Cavallo was a major port of entry and was captured by the Union.

French colonization of Texas
In 1684, René-Robert Cavelier, Sieur de La Salle came ashore on the Texas Gulf Coast at this point establishing the first French colony.

References

External links
 
 
 

Landforms of Calhoun County, Texas
Bodies of water of Texas
Inlets of the United States